Tarnawa  is a village in the administrative district of Gmina Łapanów, within Bochnia County, Lesser Poland Voivodeship, in southern Poland. Tarnawa had previously been in the Tarnów Voivodeship (1975–1998).

References

Tarnawa